Georg Klein (1 March 1964 in Germany) is a sound, video and media artist and composer. Based in Berlin, he also lived in Rome, Los Angeles and Istanbul.

Art work 

With a background in composition, Georg Klein has developed a multi-faceted artistic practice, in which he works with sound, video, text, and photography. In his installations and interventions – in particular those in public spaces – he intensifies the visual, acoustic, situational and political aspects into an area of tension, in which visitors become involved, either on an interactive or participatory basis.
The point of departure of his work is the investigation of sites and situations. He focuses on their inherent contradictions, which he transforms aesthetically so as to become a topic of discussion and deliberation. The theme of borders and their transgression, in psychological inner space and in political public space, plays an important role in his work, both in terms of content as well as form.
With his site-specific installations, as well as his concert works and radio play-like sound walks, he challenges, in an irritating manner, his public’s perception of the border between art and reality. He plays with trans-border, audio-visual communication spaces using techniques such as the artistic fake, which lead the recipient into an uncertain terrain, to question identities, and, in a provocative fashion, forces the visitor to engage in critical reflection.
In recent years, the artistic debate on societal power relations in politics and the economy has been the focus of his artistic as well as curatorial work. His interventions in both physical space and the public media have at times provoked strong reactions from the public and press, as his work has often made use of a subversive-affirmative strategy and has thereby abandoned the safe and secure framework of art.

"Georg Klein’s work is an anomaly in both sound and new media art. In sound art there is no other artistic position that deals so intensively and rigorously with social reality and public urban space. While these themes are more widespread in new media art, one finds no other artists in that field who have given the musical and the auditory the same precedence, nor is there the same kind of connection to place that Klein has developed. These two aspects constitute the unique quality of this artist’s aesthetic thinking: The precision and sensitivity with which he chooses sounds, noises, images, poems and text compositions for a given project are as unusual as the site-specificity that forms the core of his aesthetic."  (Prof. Sabine Sanio, UdK Berlin).

Education and career 

Georg Klein was born in 1964 in Germany. He began his studies in sound engineering and communication studies first at the Technical University of Munich, and later at the Technical University of Berlin. He then studied the philosophy of religion, psychoanalysis, and music ethnology at the Freie Universität Berlin. He worked for three years as a research assistant for a project on the visualization of sound for deaf people and was also a lecturer at the FU Berlin. In 1996, he first emerged as a composer (Berlin International Film Festival) and worked in the following years in the Electronic Studio of the TU Berlin on live electronic and computer music. In 2001, he turned to installation as his artistic form and public space as his performance site  (transition 2001, Ortsklang Marl Mitte German Sound Art Award 2002). From 2001 to 2005, he was chairman of the Berlin Society of New Music (bgnm). He later began to incorporate the medium of video in his work.

In 2003, he founded KlangQuadrat (Sound Square), an office for sound and media art, with Julia Gerlach. Their projects received support from the Capital Cultural Fund in Berlin, the Goethe-Institute, the German Foreign Office, the German-Polish Foundation, and the Schering Foundation. With his project TRASA (2004/2006) he received international attention: he extended public space by connecting two cities for two months ("Bi-medial Space of Contact" in six cities of Europe). Therefore, he developed a concept of interactive media art at certain urban places (subway entrance halls). With the Swiss performance artist Steffi Weismann he created dialogical, interactive installations (pickup 2005, takeaway 2006, venture doll 2008, UNorJUSTNESS A+B 2013). In his installation turmlaute.2: watch tower (2007 / 2014) he worked with a fake by founding a new political organisation which provoked strong reactions in public (http://www.europeanborderwatch.org).

In 2009 two of his most delicate works were realized: Sprich mit mir in the Red-Light-District of Braunschweig and RamallahTours in Israel, this work dealing again with a fake in public space and the internet (http://www.ramallahtours.info). In 2010 he showed a dual audio-visual installation on oriental and occidental assassins: gunmen and martyrs ("Cuts and Creeds") in Berlin and Istanbul, using the self-manifestations of young, male assassins. Borders and their violation – politically and mentally – are the central topic in his exhibition “borderlines” (European Media Art Festival EMAF 2011) including his ongoing work tracing Godwin with an illegal immigrant from Nigeria appearing in the streets of different European cities. With his work GNADE / MERCY (Mannheim, 2012), installed in front of banks and job centers, the work UNzuRECHT / UNorJUSTICE (Switzerland, 2013) and toposonie::spree (Berlin, 2013, see http://www.toposonie.info) he takes up current social themes in order to expand on them in a confusing and ambivalent manner, challenging the viewer/listener to confrontational examination.

In 2015 he got the Dialogue Award of the Federal Ministry of Foreign Affairs, Germany, for his project European Border Watch Organisation at the European Media Art Festival EMAF in Osnabrueck. The jury (Abina Manning, Olaf Stüber, Peter Zorn) said: "Passing by an official looking office on a local side street, it may happen that a middle-aged person seduces us to engage in a Mephisto like debate. “The European Border Watch” encourages us to police the borders ourselves from the comfort of our own homes. This convincing creepy fake project finally forces us to strengthen our own arguments and be continually vigilant against the slippery slide of fanatical ideas." 'Borders and Migration' are the main topic also in following works like Deep Difference Unit (Daegu, South Korea 2016), Grün Hören / Listening Green (Berlin, 2017) and The Sound before Silence  - Souvenirs from North Korea (Berlin, 2018). In 2020, he received the Audio Walk Award for his soundwalk toposonie::engelbecken, which connects historical radio testimonies with the present in a place steeped in history. He dealt with the recent past in his immersive audiovisual installation Dark Matter(2021), which traces the development of hate speech in radical right-wing music and propaganda and ends with the attack in Halle (Saale) in 2019 Halle_synagogue_shooting. 

Georg Klein organized and curated various events and exhibitions, as well in his role as chair of the bgnm (staatsbank berlin, 2001-2005), as co-founder of the Errant Bodies group berlin (since 2013, now: Errant Sound), as curator at the MuseumsQuartier Vienna ("Post Colonial Flagship Store" PCFS, 2014) and at the DYSTOPIE - sound art festival, 2018, funded by Senate of Berlin, and 2020, funded by Kulturstiftung des Bundes. Since 1998, he has held many lectures in Germany and abroad, published numerous essays dealing with sound and media art, as well as art in public space, and he has given workshops, including at the Berlin University of Arts (UdK / Sound Studies) and the Istanbul Bilgi University and in 2015 at the Hochschule für Gestaltung HfG Karlsruhe too. Since 2013, he has been a lecturer in General Studies at the UdK Berlin and currently he is professor for sound art and director of the masters program Sound Studies and Sonic Arts.

Awards and grants 
 Stipend by German Academy of Arts, Berlin (2021)
 Audio Walk Award, Germany (2020)
 Residency Villa Aurora, Los Angeles, US (2019)
 Working Stipend by Senat of Berlin in Sound Art / Composition, Berlin (2018)
 Project Space Prize for Errant Sound by Senat of Berlin, Berlin (2016)
 1st prize IGA sound art competition 2017, Berlin (2016)
 EMAF Dialogue Award of the Federal Ministry of Foreign Affairs, European Media Art Festival, Germany (2015)
 Curator in Residence, MuseumsQuartier Vienna, Austria (2014)
 Artist in Residence, Taranto, Italy (2013)
 Artist in Residence, Schlossmediale Werdenberg, Switzerland (2013)
 Artist in Residence, quartier21/Tonspur, MuseumsQuartier Vienna, Austria (2012)
 Grant by Senat of Berlin at BM Contemporary Art Center Istanbul, Turkey (2010)
 Media-Space-Preis 2006, Skulpturenmuseum Marl / NRW, Germany (2006)
 Scholarship by Deutsche Akademie Rom, Italy (Villa Massimo / Casa Baldi), Italy (2006)
 Scholarship Stiftung Kulturfonds, Germany (2003)
 Scholarship Schloß Wiepersdorf, Germany  (2002)
 Sound Art Scholarship by Senat of Berlin, Germany  (2000)
 Gustav-Mahler Composition Prize Austria (1999)

Works (selection) 
 3 new nurses, 3-part sound installation in Schwesternpark Witten (Wittener Tage für zeitgen. Musik, Witten 2022)
 passage, Interactive  sound installation under a traffic bridge (intraregionale, Burgdorf/Hannover 2021)
 Dark Matter, Immersive Sound-Video-Installation (Errant Sound, Berlin 2021)
 The Sound before Silence, sound and video installation with objects (Berlin 2018)
 Fog Zone, audiovisual installation in a fog space, DYSTOPIE - sound art festival (Berlin 2018)
 Grün Hören / Listening Green, permanent sound installation at IGA / Gardens of the World (Berlin 2017)
 Deep Difference Unit, sound sculpture, Art Biennale Daegu (South Korea 2016)
 ungrounded, walk-in space bubble with interactive installation (Hannover 2016)
 European Border Watch Organisation, European Media Art Festival EMAF (Osnabrueck, 2015)
 The Interactive Piano, installation, Festival Klangwerkstatt, Sophiensaele (Berlin, 2014)
 PCFS - Post Colonial Flagship Store, in coop. with Sven Kalden, Exhibition at MuseumsQuartier (Wien, 2014)
 toposonie::spree, sound Walk with smartphone app (Berlin 2013)
 UNzuRECHT A + B, in coop. with Steffi Weismann, installation and performance, Schlossmediale Werdenberg (Switzerland, 2013)
 GNADE / MERCY, intervention in public space and media altar of mercy (Nationaltheater Mannheim, 2012)
 tracing Godwin, participative poster action, Europe, since 2011
 mirror songs, installation at a prison facade (Türkei, Sinopale III, 2010)
 Cuts and Creeds – Young, male assassins in an oriental-occidental perspective, (Berlin/Istanbul, 2010)
 RamallahTours, installation with a travel agency (Umm El Fahem / Tel Aviv, Exhibition „29km“ 2009)
 Sprich mit mir, interactive sound installation(Konsumverein, Braunschweig 2009)
 venture doll, in coop. with Steffi Weismann, (Los Angeles 2008)
 sonic parole, Media Facades Festival (Berlin 2008)
 meta.stasen, tram installation (Europ. Zentrum der Künste Hellerau, Dresden 2007)
 turmlaute.2: Wachturm, border project Festival MaerzMusik (Berlin 2007)
 turmlaute.1: Hungerturm, sound and video installation (Rome, German Academy Villa Massimo/Casa Baldi, 2006)
 takeaway, in Koop. mit Steffi Weismann, installationsonambiente Intern. Klangkunstfestival (Berlin 2006)
 sixis, für Sextett mit Spiegelsextett (Berlin 2006)
 DADAyama, in coop. with Tetsuo Furodate (Berlin 2006)
 pickup – Intervention at a Kiosk, in Koop. mit Steffi Weismann (Bern 2005)
 TRASA warszawa-berlin, Ein bimedialer Kontaktraum, (Warschau-Berlin 2004)
 PeerGynt – stage music/conductor, (Berliner Ensemble, director: Peter Zadek, 2004-2008)
 Imperial News, (Rotes Rathaus Berlin 2003, Stiftung Kulturfonds)
 wel-come, sound installation (Schloss Wiepersdorf)
 Ortsklang Marl Mitte – blaues blach – VielKunst.WenigArbeit, (Deutscher Klangkunstpreis 2002)
 transition – berlin junction, interactive sound installation (Philharmonie Berlin, 2001/2002)
 Li.. und die Erde I+II, (Intern. Gustav-Mahler-Kompositionspreis 1999)
 amor fati, (film music, Intern. Filmfestspiele Berlin 1997)

Catalogs or reviews 

 borderlines - Auf der Grenze, Thematic catalog of works of Georg Klein, Ed. S.Sanio, German/English, Kehrer 2014, 
 Drehung im Kopf, Georg Klein. In: Neue Zeitschrift für Musik, Heft 5-2014, Ed. Rolf W. Stoll, Schott Music 2014, ISSN 0945-6945
 BLICK-Interview  by Barbara Kepa with Georg Klein, English, Berliner Pool, 2013
 Gratwanderung zwischen Kunst und Politik 2012, Stefan Fricke / Georg Klein, In: MusikTexte, Issue 135, ISSN 0178-8884
 Stadtkunst als Bild, Text, Klang 2011, Georg Klein Sprich mit mir, In: KUNSTFORUM International, Issue 212: res publica 2.0, Hg. Paolo Bianchi.
 Don't call it art! – On strategies of media art in public space, ISEA 2010 Ruhr Conference Proceedings, Ed. J.Funke, A.Broeckmann et.al., Revolver Berlin 2010, 
 29 km Katalog Kunstgalerie Umm El Fahem, Ed. Shlomit Baumann, dt.-arab.-hebr., Jerusalem 2009
 klangstaetten|stadtklaenge Katalog+DVD, Ed.  Allg. Konsumverein e.V., dt.-engl., Braunschweig 2009
 Site-Sounds – On strategies of sound art in public space, In: Organised Sound 14/1, 2009 (Cambridge University Press), ISSN 1355-7718
 Deutsche Video-Kunst / Medien-Raum-Wettbewerb 2006-2008, Katalog, 
 sonambiente Klangkunstfestival Katalog, 2006, 
 The Making of Alex Katalog Urban Art Stories, 2005, 
 transition – berlin junction, eine klangsituation Katalog, 2001, 
 Deutscher Klangkunstpreis Katalog, 2002, 
 TRASA warszawa-berlin Katalog, 2004, 
 Electronic in New Music 2006, 
 Unter freiem Himmel – Klangkunst im öffentlichen Raum In: musik|politik, BGNM-Jahrbuch 2002, 
 From the sound installation to the sound situation In: Organised Sound 8/2, 2003 (Cambridge University Press), ISSN 1355-7718
 Kazuo Uehara Sound Art in re-unioned City of Berlin. Osaka Univers. Journal of Arts No.18, 2002
 Christa Brüstle: TRASA – Kontaktraum zwischen Warschau und Berlin. In: Positionen 62 (Mühlenbeck b. Berlin, 2005)
 Barbara Barthelmes: Georg Klein oder der Künstler als Orts-Seher. In: Katalog TRASA warszawa-berlin. Kehrer-Verlag, Heidelberg, 2004, 
 Doris Kolesch: Gehör-Gänge – Zu Georg Kleins Klangsituation „transition“ in Richard Serras Skulptur „Berlin Junction“. Art lecture 2002. SFB Kulturen des Performativen, Freie Universität Berlin.
 Sabine Sanio: im vorübergehen? kunst und eingedenken In: textbuch transition, Pfau-Verlag (Saarbrücken, 2001),

References

External links 
 Website of the artist (German/English) 
 KlangQuadrat/SoundSquare - office for sound and media art Berlin
 English Interview by B.Kepa / Berliner Pool 
 Berlin Society of New Music
 sonambiente Sound Art Festival, Interactive takeaway wagon
 DeutschlandRadio Arts Birthday with DADAyama 
 Berliner Festspiele: Tower Music 
 Sound Art Festival klangstaetten|stadtklaenge

1964 births
Living people
German installation artists
Experimental composers
German sound artists
Technical University of Munich alumni
German video artists
Male classical composers
20th-century male musicians